The McKell ministry (1941–1944) or First McKell ministry was the 50th ministry of the New South Wales Government, and was led by the 27th Premier, William McKell, of the Labor Party. The ministry was the first of two occasions when the Government was led by McKell, as Premier.

McKell was first elected to the New South Wales Legislative Assembly in 1917 and served continuously until 1947, when he resigned to become the 12th Governor-General of Australia. Having served as a junior minister in the first and third ministries of Jack Lang, during the 1930s McKell came to oppose Lang's dictatorial rule and critical of electoral failures. In 1939 McKell displaced Lang as Labor leader and NSW Leader of the Opposition.

McKell led Labor to victory at the 1941 state election, defeating the United Australia Party / Country Party coalition of Alexander Mair and Michael Bruxner.

This ministry covers the period from 16 May 1941 until 8 June 1944, when the 1944 state election saw McKell re-elected for a subsequent term.

Composition of ministry
The composition of the ministry was announced by Premier McKell on 16 May 1941 and covers the full term of government, until 8 June 1944.

See also

William McKell – 27th Premier of New South Wales
Second McKell ministry
Members of the New South Wales Legislative Assembly, 1941-1944
Members of the New South Wales Legislative Council, 1940–1943
Members of the New South Wales Legislative Council, 1943–1946

References

 

! colspan="3" style="border-top: 5px solid #cccccc" | New South Wales government ministries

New South Wales ministries
1941 establishments in Australia
1944 disestablishments in Australia
Australian Labor Party ministries in New South Wales